Our American Cousin is a three-act play by English playwright Tom Taylor. It is a farce featuring awkward, boorish American Asa Trenchard, who is introduced to his aristocratic English relatives when he goes to England to claim the family estate. The play premiered with great success at Laura Keene's Theatre in New York City in 1858, with Keene in the cast, the title character played by Joseph Jefferson, and Edward Askew Sothern playing Lord Dundreary. The play's long-running London production in 1861 was also successful.

The play achieved great renown during its first few years and remained very popular throughout the second half of the 19th century. It is best known in modern times as the play that U.S. President Abraham Lincoln was attending in Ford's Theatre in Washington, D.C., when he was assassinated by John Wilkes Booth at the end of the American Civil War.

Theatrical acclaim and "Lord Dundreary"

Among Our American Cousin'''s cast was British actor Edward Askew Sothern, playing Lord Dundreary, a caricature of a brainless English nobleman. Sothern had already achieved fame on the New York stage in the play Camille in 1856, and had been reluctant to take on the role because he felt that it was too small and unimportant. He mentioned his qualms to his friend Joseph Jefferson, who had been cast in the lead role, and Jefferson supposedly responded with the famous line: "There are no small parts, only small actors."Our American Cousin premiered in New York on October 15, 1858. After several weeks of performances, Sothern began portraying the role more broadly, as a lisping, skipping, eccentric, weak-minded fop prone to nonsensical references to sayings of his "bwother" Sam. His ad-libs were a sensation, earning good notices for his physical comedy and spawning much imitation and mockery in both the United States and England. Sothern gradually expanded the role, adding gags and business until it became the central figure of the play. The most famous scene involved Dundreary reading a letter from his even sillier brother. The play ran for 150 nights, which was very successful for a New York run at the time.

Sothern made his London debut when the play opened at the Haymarket Theatre on 11 November 1861. Reviews were mixed. The Morning Post praised Sothern, but said that the play could scarcely be said to be worthy of his talents; The Athenaeum found the piece humorous and outrageus, and Sothern's performance "certainly the funniest thing in the world ... a vile caricature of an inane nobleman, intensely ignorant, and extremely indolent"; The Era thought the play "a hasty work, manufactured to suit the American market ... a sort of dramatic curiosity". The play closed on 21 December 1861 after 36 performances; after this inauspicious start it was revived at the same theatre on 27 January 1862 and ran uninterruptedly until 23 December for 314 successive performances. Sothern successfully revived the play many times, making Dundreary by far his most famous role.

"Dundrearyisms", twisted aphorisms in the style of Lord Dundreary (e.g. "birds of a feather gather no moss"), enjoyed a brief vogue. And the character's style of beard – long, bushy sideburns – gave the English language the word dundrearies. In his autobiography, writer George Robert Sims recalled that "we went Dundreary mad in '61. The shop windows were filled with Dundreary scarves, and Brother Sam scarves, and there were Dundreary collars and Dundreary shirts, and Dundrearyisms were on every lip."

It was not long before the success of this play inspired an imitation, Charles Gayler's Our Female American Cousin, which opened in New York City in January 1859. None of the characters from the original play appeared in this comedy. A number of sequel plays to Our American Cousin were written, all featuring several characters from the original, and focusing on the Lord Dundreary character. The first was Gayler's Our American Cousin at Home, or, Lord Dundreary Abroad, which premiered in Buffalo, New York, in November 1860, and had its New York City debut the following May. Later sequels included Henry James Byron's Dundreary Married and Done For, and John Oxenford's Brother Sam (1862; revived in 1865), a play about Dundreary's brother.

Principal roles and original cast

 Asa Trenchard (a rustic American) – Joseph Jefferson
 Sir Edward Trenchard (a baronet) – Edwin Varrey
 Florence Trenchard (his daughter) – Laura Keene
 Mary Meredith (a poor cousin) – Sara Stevens
 Lord Dundreary (an idiotic English nobleman) – E.A. Sothern
 Mr. Coyle (a businessman) – J.G. Burnett
 Abel Murcott (his clerk) – C.W. Couldock
 Lt. Harry Vernon (of the Royal Navy) – M. Levick
 Mr. Binny (a butler) – Mr. Peters
 Mrs. Mountchessington – Mary Wells
 Augusta (her daughter) – E. Germon
 Georgina (another daughter) – Mrs. Sothern

Synopsis
Act I

In the drawing room at Trenchard Manor, the servants remark on their employer's poor financial circumstances. Florence Trenchard, an aristocratic young beauty, loves Lieutenant Harry Vernon of the Royal Navy, but she is unable to marry him until he progresses to a higher rank. She receives a letter from her brother Ned, who is currently in the United States. Ned has met some rustic cousins from a branch of the family that had immigrated to America two centuries earlier. They relay to Ned that great-uncle Mark Trenchard had, after angrily disinheriting his children and leaving England years ago, found these cousins in Brattleboro, Vermont. He had moved in with them and eventually made Asa, one of the sons, heir to his property in England. Asa is now sailing to England to claim the estate.

Asa is noisy, coarse, and vulgar, but honestly forthright and colourful. The English Trenchards are alternately amused and appalled by this Vermont cousin. Richard Coyle, agent of the estate, meets with Sir Edward Trenchard (Florence's father) and tells the baronet that the family faces bankruptcy unless they can repay a debt to Coyle. Coyle is concealing the evidence that the loan had been repaid long ago by Sir Edward's late father. Coyle suggests that the loan would be satisfied if he may marry Florence, who detests him. Meanwhile, Asa and the butler, Binny, try to understand each other's unfamiliar ways, as Asa tries to understand what the purpose of a shower might be, dousing himself while fully clothed.

Act II

Mrs. Mountchessington is staying at Trenchard Manor. She advises Augusta, her daughter, to be attentive to the presumably wealthy Vermont "savage". Meanwhile, her other daughter Georgina is courting an imbecilic nobleman named Dundreary by pretending to be ill. Florence's old tutor, the unhappy alcoholic Abel Murcott, warns her that Coyle intends to marry her. Asa overhears this and offers Florence his help. Murcott is Coyle's clerk and has found proof that Florence's late grandfather paid off the loan to Coyle.

Florence and Asa visit her cousin, Mary Meredith. Mary is the granddaughter of old Mark Trenchard, who left his estate to Asa. Mary is very poor and has been raised as a humble dairy maid. Asa does not care about her social status and is attracted to her. Florence has not been able to bring herself to tell Mary that her grandfather's fortune had been left to Asa. Florence tells Asa that she loves Harry, who needs a good assignment to a ship. Asa uses his country wile to persuade Dundreary to help Harry get a ship. Meanwhile, Coyle has been up to no good, and the bailiffs arrive at Trenchard Manor.

Act III
At her dairy farm, Asa tells Mary about her grandfather in America, but he fibs about the end of the tale: He says that old Mark Trenchard changed his mind about disinheriting his English children and burned his will. Asa promptly burns the will himself, under the pretext of lighting a cigar. Florence discovers this and points it out to Mary, saying: "It means that he is a true hero, and he loves you, you little rogue." Meanwhile, Mrs. Mountchessington still hopes that Asa will propose to Augusta. When Asa tells them that Mark Trenchard had left Mary his fortune, Augusta and Mrs. Mountchessington are quite rude, but Asa stands up for himself.

Asa proposes to Mary and is happily accepted. He then sneaks into Coyle's office with Murcott and retrieves the paper that shows that the debt was paid. Asa confronts Coyle and insists that Coyle must pay off Sir Edward's other debts, with his doubtless ill-gotten gains, and also apologize to Florence for trying to force her into marriage. He also demands Coyle's resignation as the steward of Trenchard Manor, making Murcott steward instead. Murcott is so pleased that he vows to stop drinking. Coyle has no choice but to do all this. Florence marries Harry, Dundreary marries Georgina, and Augusta marries an old beau. Even the servants marry.

Lincoln assassination

The play's most famous performance was at Ford's Theatre in Washington, D.C. on April 14, 1865. The cast modified a line of the play in honor of Abraham Lincoln: when the heroine asked for a seat protected from the draft, the replyscripted as, "Well, you're not the only one that wants to escape the draft"was delivered instead as, "The draft has already been stopped by order of the President!" Halfway through Act III, Scene 2, the character of Asa Trenchard, played that night by Harry Hawk, utters this line, considered one of the play's funniest, to Mrs. Mountchessington:

During the ensuing laughter, John Wilkes Booth, a famous actor and Confederate sympathizer who was not a member of the play's cast, snuck into Lincoln's box, raised his Derringer pistol, and fatally shot Lincoln in the back of the head. Familiar with the play, Booth had chosen that moment in the hope that the audience's laughter would mask the sound of his gunshot. Booth then leaped from Lincoln's box onto the stage and made his escape through the back of the theater to a horse he had left waiting in the alley. That night, the remainder of the play was suspended. To this day, Our American Cousin has never been restaged at Ford's Theatre.

Popular culture
In 1862 Charles Kingsley wrote a parody, the "Great Hippocampus Question", in the style of Lord Dundreary, and incorporated parts of this in The Water-Babies published in 1863.

In the 1950 film All About Eve, Bill Sampson says to Margo Channing,
"I've always denied the legend that you were in 'Our American Cousin' the night Lincoln was shot."Our American Cousin was adapted for the radio anthology program On Stage in 1953. In a move that earned him a rebuke from CBS management, director, producer, and actor Elliott Lewis aired it in the same hour as his show Crime Classics' episode "The Assassination of Abraham Lincoln".

In a brief scene in the 2000 film Bedazzled, Elliot becomes President Lincoln at the theater, recognizes the name of the play, realizes he is about to be murdered, and tries to leave.  As an excuse, he says that he has already seen the play, but is informed that is impossible, because it is "an entirely new play."  In reality, the play was six and a half years old at the time of the assassination and Lincoln had actually already seen the play before (and didn't like it).

Eric W. Sawyer's 2008 opera Our American Cousin'' presents a fictionalized version of the night of Lincoln's assassination from the point of view of the actors in the cast of Taylor's play.

References

External links

 
 
 
 Our American Cousin – The Script, Cast and Lincoln Assassination 
 The history of Our American Cousin and the legal issues surrounding its ownership.
 Modern look at the play, written to commemorate the 200th anniversary of Abraham Lincoln's birth.
 Audio recording of the play (from archive.org) by professional actors at LostPlays.com, including a recreation of the assassination moment
 Lincoln's last play; or, the continuing fascination with Our American Cousin from the Museum of the City of New York Collections blog

1858 plays
Assassination of Abraham Lincoln
Plays by Tom Taylor
Plays set in England